David Salariya (born 1954) is a founder of Salariya Book Company.

Early life
Salariya was born Dundee, Scotland in 1954 and received education in Art School not too far away from his house. He later pursued career as an illustrator by attending both Ancrum Road Primary School and Duncan of Jordanstone College of Art from which he graduated in 1979. The same year he graduated he moved to London where he showed his works to various magazine and book publishers.

Career
His first illustration was designed for Reader's Digest which put a path in his career as an illustrator. In 1986 he did around 50 books for Giunti Marzocco in Florence, Italy. Three years later he founded Salariya Book Company and became its editorial packager. Around the same time he issued series of 18 books titled Inside Story with the first one Egyptian Pyramid becoming a winner of Times Ed Award which was followed by two more which won that award as well. Shortly after receiving of multiple awards he publishes two series of books called Timelines and X-Ray Picture Books. In 1993 he and his company buys an office in Marlborough Place, Brighton and four years later he begins selling his books to various publishers, one of which, Book House, by 2001 buys his imprint.

In 2009 he and his company published a series of books called The Cherished Library and the same year launched Amos Daragon series which was brought from a French-Canadian publisher called Les Intouchables and was published by Scribo. On 1 April 2010 he and his company have published three books in the United Kingdom including Augmented Reality,  What Lola Wants…Lola Gets and Tyrone The Clean 'O' Saurus.

Personal life
He lives in Brighton with his wife Shirley and their son Jonathan.

References

1954 births
Living people
British illustrators
Artists from Dundee
Alumni of the University of Dundee